In chemistry, dioxirane (systematically named dioxacyclopropane, also known as methylene peroxide or peroxymethane) is a compound with formula , whose molecule consists of a ring with one carbon and two oxygen atoms, and two hydrogen atoms attached to the carbon.  It is a heterocyclic compound, the smallest cyclic organic peroxide. 

The compound itself is highly unstable and has never been observed at room temperature. Derivatives in which the hydrogens are replaced by other functional groups are called dioxiranes, and may be more stable. Some of them, such as dimethyldioxirane (DMDO) and the more reactive methyl(trifluoromethyl)dioxirane, are used in organic synthesis as oxidizing reagents, most notably as the key catalytic intermediate in the Shi epoxidation reaction.   Difluorodioxirane, which boils at about –80 to –90 °C, is one of the very few dioxirane derivatives that is stable in pure form at room temperature.

Synthesis
Dioxirane is highly unstable and the majority of studies of it have been computational; it has been detected during the low temperature (-196 °C) reaction of ethylene and ozone, although even at these temperatures such a mixture can be explosive. Its formation is thought to be radical in nature, preceding via a Criegee intermediate. Microwave analysis has indicated C-H, C-O and O-O bond lengths of 1.090, 1.388 and 1.516 Å respectively. The very long and weak O-O bond (c.f. hydrogen peroxide O-O = 1.47 Å) is the origin of its instability.

See also
 Oxaziridine
 Ethylene oxide
 1,2-Dioxetane
 1,3-Dioxetane

References

 
Functional groups
Organic peroxides